Lawunuia, or Piva, is a minor Austronesian language of Papua New Guinea.

References

Northwest Solomonic languages
Languages of Papua New Guinea
Languages of the Autonomous Region of Bougainville